Jaan Jung (18 November 1835 Tammeküla, Pilistvere Parish – 26 June 1900 Tamme, Imavere Parish) was an Estonian educator, cultural personnel, archeology and history enthusiast.

1854-1856 he studied at Pilistvere parish school. 1867-1899 he was the organist at Halliste Congregation. 1857-1896 he taught at Kaidi School, located in Abja Parish.

He was a member of many Estonian national societies, eg Society of Estonian Literati.

Since 1874 he started to register archeological objects located in Estonia.

Works
 Liiwimaa kuningas Magnus ja Wene Zaar Joann Wassiljewitsh IV ehk tükike Wene- ja Läänemere maade ajalugust aastast 1530 kunni 1584. Tartu, 1874
 Mönda Isamaa wanust aegust. Tartu, 1874
 Rootslaste wäljarändamine Hiiumaalt aastal 1781, ja teiste Eestimaal elawa Rootslaste loust aastast 1345 kunni 1800. Tartu, 1875
 Liiwlaste würst Kaupo, ja sõdimised tema päewil, kui ka Liiwi rahwast ja nende kadumisest siin maal. Tartu, 1876
 Sõda Wolmari linna al ja Rakwere linna õnnetu kadumine. Tartu, 1876
 Jutustused Türgi sõaplatsist. Viljandi, 1877
 Sakala maa ja Wiliandi lossi ja linna aja loust : Lõpetuses mõned Wiliandi maa rahwa wanad jutud. Tartu, 1878
 Eesti rahwa wanast usust, kombedest ja juttudest. Tartus, 1879
 Järwa maa ja Paide lossi ja linna aja loust. Tartu, 1879
 Nurmegunde maa ja Põltsama lossi ja linna aja loust. Tartu, 1879
 Über einige Altertümer aus dem Kirchspiel Hallist und der Umgegend im Pernauschen Kreise Livlands. Dorpat, 1882
 Õntsa dr. Martin Luteruse elu lugu : Luteruse 400 aastase sündmise pääwa mälestuseks. Tartu, 1883
 Halliste ja Karksi kirikute ja kihelkondade ajalugu : Halliste kiriku 25-aastase juubileumi mälestuseks. Tartu, 1893
 Muinasaja teadus Eestlaste maal. I (II) osa : kohalised muinasaja kirjeldused Liiwimaalt, Pernu ja Wiljandi maakonnast. Tartu, 1898; [Faksiimiletr.]. Tallinn, 2000
 Muinasaja teadus Eestlaste maalt. I, Üleüldine muinasaja kirjeldus. Tartu, 1899
 Muinasaja teadus Eestlaste maalt. II, Kohalised muinasaja kirjeldused Liiwimaalt, Pernu ja Wiljandi. Tartu, 1899
 Muinasajateadus eestlaste maalt : III, Kohalised muinasaja kirjeldused Tallinnamaalt. Tallinn, 1910

References

1835 births
1900 deaths
Estonian schoolteachers
Estonian archaeologists
19th-century Estonian historians
People from Järva Parish